Yuliya Vladimirovna Sotnikova (born 18 November 1970 in Volgograd) is a Russian world indoor champion and Olympic bronze medallist in the 4 x 400 metres relay. She specializes in the 400 metres and has a personal best time of 50.73s.

She competed for Russia in the 2000 Summer Olympics in the 4 × 400 metres relay where she won the bronze medal with her team mates Svetlana Gontcharenko, Olga Kotlyarova and Irina Privalova.

International competitions

See also
4 × 400 metres relay at the Olympics
4 × 400 metres relay at the World Championships in Athletics
List of Olympic medalists in athletics (women)
List of 2000 Summer Olympics medal winners
List of World Athletics Championships medalists (women)
List of European Athletics Indoor Championships medalists (women)
List of people from Volgograd

References

 

Sportspeople from Volgograd
1970 births
Living people
Russian female sprinters
Olympic female sprinters
Olympic athletes of Russia
Olympic bronze medalists for Russia
Olympic bronze medalists in athletics (track and field)
Athletes (track and field) at the 2000 Summer Olympics
Medalists at the 2000 Summer Olympics
Universiade gold medalists in athletics (track and field)
Universiade gold medalists for Russia
World Athletics Championships medalists
World Athletics Indoor Championships winners
European Athletics Indoor Championships winners
Russian Athletics Championships winners